Para Commandos may refer to:

 Para Commando Brigade (Bangladesh)
 1st Para-Commando Battalion
 2nd Para-Commando Battalion
 Special Operations Regiment (Belgium)
 2nd Commando (Paracommando) Battalion
 3rd Paratroopers (Paracommando) Battalion
 Para-Commando Battalion (Cambodia) (Historical)
 Para Commandos (India)
 Kopassus (Indonesia), including Group 1 Para Commandos and Group 2 Para Commandos
 Special Operations Command parachute team (United States), also called the Para-Commandos